The drag coefficient is a common measure in automotive design as it pertains to aerodynamics. Drag is a force that acts parallel to and in the same direction as the airflow. The drag coefficient of an automobile measures the way the automobile passes through the surrounding air. When automobile companies design a new vehicle they take into consideration the automobile drag coefficient in addition to the other performance characteristics. Aerodynamic drag increases with the square of speed; therefore it becomes critically important at higher speeds. Reducing the drag coefficient in an automobile improves the performance of the vehicle as it pertains to speed and fuel efficiency. There are many different ways to reduce the drag of a vehicle. A common way to measure the drag of the vehicle is through the drag area.

Reducing drag
The reduction of drag in road vehicles has led to increases in the top speed of the vehicle and the vehicle's fuel efficiency, as well as many other performance characteristics, such as handling and acceleration. The two main factors that impact drag are the frontal area of the vehicle and the drag coefficient. The drag coefficient is a unit-less value that denotes how much an object resists movement through a fluid such as water or air. A potential complication of altering a vehicle's aerodynamics is that it may cause the vehicle to get too much lift. Lift is an aerodynamic force that acts perpendicular to the airflow around the body of the vehicle. Too much lift can cause the vehicle to lose road traction which can be very unsafe. Lowering the drag coefficient comes from streamlining the exterior body of the vehicle. Streamlining the body requires assumptions about the surrounding airspeed and characteristic use of the vehicle.

Deletion
The deletion of parts on a vehicle is an easy way for designers and vehicle owners to reduce parasitic and frontal drag of the vehicle with little cost and effort. Deletion can be as simple as removing an aftermarket part, or part that has been installed on the vehicle after production, or having to modify and remove an OEM part, meaning any part of the vehicle that was originally manufactured on the vehicle. Most production sports cars and high efficiency vehicles come standard with many of these deletions in order to be competitive in the automotive and race market, while others choose to keep these drag-increasing aspects of the vehicle for their visual aspects, or to fit the typical uses of their customer base.

Roof rack
A roof rack is a common trait on many SUV and station wagon vehicles. While roof racks are very useful in carrying extra storage on a vehicle, they also increase the frontal area of the vehicle and increase the drag coefficient. This is because the air flows over the top of the vehicle, following the smooth lines of the hood and windshield, then collides with the roof rack and causes turbulence. The removal of this part has led to increases in fuel efficiency in several studies.

Mud flaps
Mudflaps are now rarely specified as standard on production cars as they interfere with the clean airflow around the vehicle. For larger vehicles such as trucks, mud flaps are still important for their control of spray, and in 2001 a new version of the mud flap was introduced that has been shown to create significantly less aerodynamic drag than standard mud flaps.

Rear spoiler
A rear spoiler usually comes standard in most sports vehicles and resembles the shape of a raised wing in the rear of the vehicle. The main purpose of a rear spoiler in a vehicle's design is to counteract lift, thereby increasing stability at higher speeds. In order to achieve the lowest possible drag, air must flow around the streamlined body of the vehicle without coming into contact with any areas of possible turbulence. A rear spoiler design that stands off the rear deck lid will increase downforce, reducing lift at high speeds while incurring a drag penalty. Flat spoilers, possibly angled slightly downward may reduce turbulence and thereby reduce the coefficient of drag. Some cars now feature automatically adjustable rear spoilers, so at lower speed the effect on drag is reduced when the benefits of reduced lift are not required.

Side mirrors
Side mirrors both increase the frontal area of the vehicle and increase the coefficient of drag since they protrude from the side of the vehicle. In order to decrease the impact that side mirrors have on the drag of the vehicle the side mirrors can be replaced with smaller mirrors or mirrors with a different shape. Several concept cars of the 2010s are replacing mirrors with tiny cameras but this option is not common for production cars because most countries require side mirrors. One of the first production passenger automobiles to swap out mirrors for cameras was the Honda e, and in this case the cameras are claimed by Honda to have decreased aerodynamic drag by "around 90% compared to conventional door mirrors" which contributed to an approximately 3.8% reduction in drag for the entire vehicle. It is estimated that two side mirrors are responsible for 2 to 7% of the total aerodynamic drag of a motor vehicle, and that removing them could improve fuel economy by 1.5–2 miles per US gallon.

Radio antenna
While they do not have the biggest impact on the drag coefficient due to their small size, radio antennas commonly found protruding from the front of the vehicle can be relocated and changed in design to rid the car of this added drag. The most common replacement for the standard car antenna is the shark fin antenna found in most high efficiency vehicles.

Windshield wipers
The effect that windshield wipers have on a vehicle's airflow varies between vehicles; however, they are often omitted from race vehicles and high efficiency concepts in order to maintain the smallest possible coefficient of drag. A much more common option is to replace the windshield wipers with lower profile wipers, or to only remove the windshield wiper on the passenger side of the vehicle, and even to fabricate a deflector to deflect the air up and over the wipers.

Another alternative is to equip the vehicle with a single wiper placed in the centre of the windshield, allowing it to cover both sides of the windshield. This mitigates the amount of drag by decreasing the frontal area of the blade. While such application may be useful for racing, for most road vehicles this would produce minimal improvement in overall drag reduction.

Fabrication
The application of new parts and concepts onto the vehicle design are easier to include when in the design stage of a vehicle, rather than in aftermarket (automotive) parts, however, the fabrication of these parts assists in the streamlining of the vehicle and can help greatly reduce the drag of the vehicle. Most vehicles with very low drag coefficients, such as race cars and high efficiency concept cars, apply these ideas to their design.

Wheel covers

When air flows around the wheel wells it gets disturbed by the rims of the vehicles and forms an area of turbulence around the wheel. In order for the air to flow more smoothly around the wheel well, smooth wheel covers are often applied. Smooth wheel covers are hub caps with no holes in them for air to pass through. This design reduces drag; however, it may cause the brakes to heat up more quickly because the covers prevent airflow around the brake system. As a result, this modification is more commonly seen in high efficiency vehicles rather than sports cars or racing vehicles.

Air curtains

Air curtains divert air flow from slots in the body and guide it towards the outside edges of the wheel wells.

Partial grille block
The front grille of a vehicle is used to direct air through the radiator. In a streamlined design the air flows around the vehicle rather than through; however, the grille of a vehicle redirects airflow from around the vehicle to through the vehicle, which then increases the drag. In order to reduce this impact a grille block is often used. A grille block covers up a portion of, or the entirety of, the front grille of a vehicle. In most high efficiency models or in vehicles with low drag coefficients, a very small grille will already be built into the vehicle's design, eliminating the need for a grille block. The grille in most production vehicles is generally designed to maximize air flow through the radiator where it exits into the engine compartment. This design can actually create too much airflow into the engine compartment, preventing it from warming up in a timely manner, and in such cases a grille block is used to increase engine performance and reduce vehicle drag simultaneously.

Under tray
The underside of a vehicle often traps air in various places and adds turbulence around the vehicle. In most racing vehicles this is eliminated by covering the entire underside of the vehicle in what is called an under tray. This tray prevents any air from becoming trapped under the vehicle and reduces drag.

Fender skirts
Fender skirts are often made as extensions of the body panels of the vehicles and cover the entire wheel wells. Much like smooth wheel covers this modification reduces the drag of the vehicle by preventing any air from becoming trapped in the wheel well and assists in streamlining the body of the vehicle. Fender skirts are more commonly found on the rear wheel wells of a vehicle because the tires do not turn and the design is much simpler. This is commonly seen in vehicles such as the first generation Honda Insight. Front fender skirts have the same effect on reducing drag as the rear wheel skirts, but must be further offset from the body in order to compensate for the tire sticking out from the body of the vehicle as turns are made.

Modified front bumper
The front bumper is the first part of the vehicle that the air must flow around. Therefore, it plays a crucial role in reducing drag. A front air dam is often used which extends from the very front of the vehicle down to the lowest part of the vehicle. This is done to direct airflow around and over the vehicle rather than allowing air to travel under it. Contoured deflectors, or tire spats, are often made as part of the front bumper in order to direct airflow around the tire without having any increase to the outward flow.

Boattails and Kammbacks
A boattail can greatly reduce a vehicle's total drag. Boattails create a teardrop shape that will give the vehicle a more streamlined profile, reducing the occurrence of drag inducing flow separation. A kammback is a truncated boattail. It is created as an extension of the rear of the vehicle, moving the rear backward at a slight angle toward the bumper of the car. This can reduce drag as well but a boattail would reduce the vehicles drag more. Nonetheless, for practical and style reasons, a kammback is more commonly seen in racing, high efficiency vehicles, and trucking.

Typical drag coefficients

The average modern automobile achieves a drag coefficient of between 0.25 and 0.3. The drag coefficient of a vehicle is affected by the shape of body of the vehicle. Various other characteristics affect the coefficient of drag as well, and are taken into account in these examples. Some sports cars have a surprisingly high drag coefficient (such as the Ariel Atom at 0.40), but this is to compensate for the amount of lift the vehicle generates, while others use aerodynamics to their advantage to gain speed and as a result have much lower drag coefficients.

Some examples of  follow. Figures given are generally for the basic model, which may not be available in some markets. Some "high performance" models may actually have higher drag, due to wider tires, extra spoilers and larger cooling systems as many basic/low power models have half size radiators with the remaining area blanked off to reduce cooling and engine bay drag.

The  of a given vehicle will vary depending on which wind tunnel it is measured in. Variations of up to 5% have been documented and variations in test technique and analysis can also make a difference.

Drag area
While designers pay attention to the overall shape of the automobile, they also bear in mind that reducing the frontal area of the shape helps reduce the drag.

The term drag area derives from aerodynamics, where it is the product of some reference area (such as cross-sectional area, total surface area, or similar) and the drag coefficient. In 2003, Car and Driver magazine adopted this metric as a more intuitive way to compare the aerodynamic efficiency of various automobiles.

The force F required to overcome drag is calculated with the drag equation:

Therefore:
Where the drag coefficient and reference area have been collapsed into the drag area term. This allows direct estimation of the drag force at a given speed for any vehicle for which only the drag area is known and therefore easier comparison.
As drag area  is the fundamental value that determines power required for a given cruise speed it is a critical parameter for fuel consumption at a steady speed. This relation also allows an estimation of the new top speed of a car with a tuned engine:

Or the power required for a target top speed:

See also
 Automotive aerodynamics
 Drag (physics)
 Drag equation
 Paul Jaray

Notes

References

External links
 Further 500 drag coefficients
 Improving Aerodynamics to Boost Fuel Economy
 Tel Aviv University reduces drag on trucks by 10%
 Simple roll-down test for measuring Cd and Crr for cars and bikes

Automotive engineering
Drag (physics)